Top Crime, often stylised TOPcrime, is a thematic television channel, dedicated to the TV series and movies on the world of crime, operated by Mediaset and owned by MFE - MediaForEurope. The broadcasts began on 1 June 2013 both on digital terrestrial television (on mux Mediaset Italia 2), and on satellite via the satellite platform Tivù Sat, both with  the channel 39. The trailer with previews of the schedule were first shown on 21 May of that year. The channel started its regular broadcasts transmitting the first two episodes of the seventh season, first-run movies for television of Bones.

The channel offers re-run television series such as Columbo and Poirot, as well as new films themed for this type of programming.

Television series

 Hannibal
 Motive
 Major Crimes
 Person of Interest
 Damages
 Chase
 Bones
 Life
 The Shield
 24
 Raising the Bar
 Women's Murder Club
 Judging Amy
 Psych
 Undercovers
 White Collar
 Rescue: Special Ops
 Magnum, P.I.
 Rescue Me
 RIS Delitti Imperfetti
 Law & Order: SVU
 Law & Order: Criminal Intent
 Prison Break
 GSG 9

Movie

 Serial Killer Story
 All Hitchcock
 John Grisham Collection
 Seven
 Red Dragon
 The Bone Collector
 Sherlock Holmes

Documentaries

 Urban Legends
 Cold blood
 True CSI
 Psychic Investigators

References

External links
Official site

Mediaset television channels
Television channels and stations established in 2013
2013 establishments in Italy
Italian-language television stations
Movie channels